Australaugeneria is a genus of marine annelids in the family Polynoidae (scale worms). The genus includes 4 species which are   commensal on  octocorals.

Description 
Elytra 15 pairs, 36–40 segments. Lateral antennae inserted ventrally (beneath prostomium and median antenna). Neuropodia deeply incised vertically, so that the neurochaetae emerge from a prominent division between the pre-chaetal (=acicular) lobe and the post-chaetal lobe. Notochaetae present, hooked neurochaetae in anterior-most segments, bidentate neurochaetae absent (summarised from detailed diagnosis of Ravara & Cunha, 2016).

Ecology 
All known species of Australaugeneria appear to be commensals on  alcyonacean or gorgonian corals.

Species 
Four species of Australaugeneria are accepted as valid as of June 2020:
Australaugeneria iberica Ravara & Cunha, 2016
Australaugeneria michaelseni Pettibone, 1969
Australaugeneria pottsi Pettibone, 1969
Australaugeneria rutilans (Grube, 1878)

References 

Phyllodocida
Polychaete genera